Jordan White (born May 6, 1984) is an American rock musician and singer-songwriter.

Early life and education
Jordan White was born May 6, 1984 in Cranford, New Jersey. His family later moved to Nazareth, Pennsylvania, where he graduated from Nazareth Area High School in the Lehigh Valley region of eastern Pennsylvania.

White graduated with an A.A. from Northampton Community College and then a B.A. from East Stroudsburg University of Pennsylvania in East Stroudsburg, Pennsylvania and M.S. from Shippensburg University of Pennsylvania in Shippensburg, Pennsylvania in the field of psychological science.

White explained that some periods of depression experienced as a teenager led him to begin composing original music, stating that music "saved me from being another statistic."

Career
White has performed as a solo artist and with cover bands, an acoustic trio, and an alternative rock band. KineticBlu formed in Allentown, Pennsylvania in 2008 although inactive until the acoustic act Foreplay, in which White, guitarist Brian Kibler and vocalist Tara Crowe, had been performing merged with drummer Rob Lilly.  White was performing a solo show in the Lehigh Valley when he was approached by Lilly about a new band he was forming. The media had once dubbed KineticBlu "The Lehigh Valley's Sexiest Rock Band".

KineticBlu was named Alternative Addiction's "Next Big Thing" for the month off October 2010 and performed at the fifth annual Bethlehem Harvest, the third annual Blue Mountain "Rock The Fall" Festival,
and, in February 2011, the 15th annual Millennium Music Conference & Showcase in Harrisburg, Pennsylvania, an event that draws nearly 300 musical acts from across the country.

High Road EP
During January 2016, White recorded a new six-song EP titled High Road with Grammy-award winning producer Jim Annunziato at Logos Studios in Massapequa, New York.  Contributing to the recording included multi-platinum selling producer and songwriter Eric Sanicola and From Autumn to Ashes rhythm guitarist Scott Gross.  The EP was released by Pangea Records on October 21, 2016.

Flexitone Records
During the summer of 2015, White signed with Flexitone Records and began recording the upcoming single "Crazy Girl" with producer David Ivory. The track was mastered by Tom Coyne. The song was released nationally on the Flexitone label in September 2015.

Four Songs
Overall, critical reviews of White's "Four Songs" have been mixed with its single "Maybe Amy" placed in rotation at hundreds of U.S. and U.K. radio stations. In an interview on Philadelphia radio, he explained the EP was an "attempt to fuse the confessional singer-songwriter vibe stemming from Southern California during the 1970s with a 1990s alternative, full band sound."  The Sentinel's Stacy Brown remarked that "Four Songs" "contains moments of pop and flavor of southern rock paired with plenty of clean guitar licks amongst White's clear and distinctive vocals."

Ashley McAteer of That Music Mag wrote that "White's catchy lyrics really do not really draw attention but are easily stuck in your head, although he seems to be giving you just what he knows."

Jennifer Shields from The Owl Mag described the EP as "taking music back to beautiful simplicity."

Charles Minguez from One Minute Sound wrote that White's "Four Songs" kicks off with the track 'Maybe, Amy' which is a throwback to the sound of 90s pop icons like Third Eye Blind and Matchbox 20; the EP then rolls into 'Bloodshot' and features heavier driven guitar riffs and a solo borrowed from the pages of Counting Crows.  'Before I Go Out', the third track, is probably the favorite and features subtle slide guitar licks and a quirky piano line.  White undeniably has an ear for writing catchy, radio-friendly songs and is extremely talented, however his musical style is a bit outdated.  Even when he is pushing out creativity, it still sounds as if he is trying too hard to emulate his influences.  White's voice is clean and crisp, though it may not be the composition as much as the production to blame."

Dustin Schoof of The Express-Times wrote that "White goes from belting out a tender, folksy acoustic tune ("Maybe, Amy") to plugging in and cutting loose on "Bloodshot," highlighted by a smoking guitar lead. "Before I Go Out" is more of a roots rocker, complete with background harmonica. "No Promises" is a piano ballad that is heartfelt without veering into cheesy territory. It's a balanced and robust and shows off White's skills as a musician and songwriter.

Michael Phoenix of "The Hub" wrote that the lead single "Maybe, Amy" "could have been from the television shows Saved by the Bell or California Dreams but gave the rest of the album a positive review, stating that "White comes back, hitting you with the hard beat of 'Bloodshot', a great change up and a way to keep your attention, while 'Before I Go Out' is a good transition song in leading into the piano ballad 'No Promises' with references made to Philadelphia and the Jersey shore, leading you to feel the passion of the song from both the music and lyrics."

DJ "RJ" from WPHT-FM "The Note" described the collection of songs as "engaging, thoughtful, and very focused; it's an enjoyable listen from a talented singer."

Sandy Lo of WHOA magazine wrote that "White's music is certainly lyrically based which is a breath of fresh air nowadays with so much machinery and big beats thrown into songs."  White also responded regarding his much publicized affair with American Idol that "the problem [with the show] is the judges dismissed the best singers but would then send a guy through wearing a clown costume."

Musical influences
White says his musical influences "started with singer-songwriters out of the 1970s," referencing Van Morrison, Jackson Browne, and Billy Joel. He also cites Guns N' Roses, Counting Crows, Tom Petty, The Beatles, Ritchie Valens, and The Clash. His music is considered a mixture of alternative rock and  acoustic-confessional pop-rock.

Awards and recognition
In November 2007, White was a finalist in the Lehigh Valley Acoustic Competition and in 2008 KineticBlu was nominated for two Lehigh Valley Music Awards.  In August 2010, White himself was nominated for three 2010 Lehigh Valley Music Awards for Best Songwriter, Best Lyricist, and Best Band Website, being chosen amongst 3,000 other fan and industry nominees.  White performed at the awards ceremony on December 5, 2010 in Allentown, Pennsylvania which was well received. White was nominated for two Montgomery/Bucks County music awards in November 2011 and also nominated for two more Lehigh Valley Music Awards, Best Songwriter and Best Male Vocalist, in April 2012 returned to WFMZ-TV.

White was nominated for three Lehigh Valley Music Awards in fall of 2012 including Best Lyricist, Best Singer-Songwriter and Best Folk Band/Soloist and for Outstanding Songwriter in the 2012 Philadelphia music awards, and in November 2013 was again nominated for five Philadelphia Music Awards including Outstanding Performer, Outstanding Singer-Songwriter, Outstanding Male Vocalist, among others.  White accompanied American Idol "top 100" contestants Tyler Grady and Tim Marchetto at the 2014 Lehigh Valley Music Awards on March 9, 2014.  The show, broadcast on television and radio has grown significantly in scope, size, and has been steadily receiving more mainstream media attention each year since its inception in the 1990s.

Personal life
In August 2021, White began chatting with Guns N’ Roses lead guitarist Slash on Twitter after White attended the band's first North American tour date of 2021 at Hershey Park in Hershey, Pennsylvania. Both musicians follow each other's Twitter profiles. The people who are successfully making a living playing music, the reason they got to that level is because they see music as a lifestyle," White told the Northeast Times, adding, "[This] requires talent, dedication and endurance" also telling the Sun-Gazette that "there are a lot of setbacks and accomplishments. Often you take two steps forward and one step back. It's just how it goes." According to February 2015 article, White still has recurring bouts with depression but is undergoing treatment to "stop dwelling on the past and focus on the future" but admitted it "could be a lifetime battle".

White is a Nissan and Mazda racing enthusiast, and has custom Datsuns, Nissan Sentras and 200sxes that are powered by the SR20DE and SR20VE engines.  He mentioned that if he wasn't a musician he "would love to work on race cars."  White says that when he first purchased a brand new Chevrolet Corvette he soon returned it "because it just wasn't me."  He is also a registered independent and animal lover, owning Chihuahuas, Dobermans, Siamese cats, and recently adopted a 2 lb chihuahua from a rescue. His mother also raises seeing-eye German Shepherds.

White also is a lifelong Philadelphia Phillies fan and in an interview with Mike Viso from "Through The Fence Baseball" when asked about the teams' 2008 World Series victory he replied "I'll always know exactly where I was when it happened. I had waited for it for 20 years. The 1993 World Series loss to the Blue Jays crushed me. I was just a little kid. I stood there in shock as I watched Joe Carter round the bases jumping up and down.  The Phillies winning it all was something I thought I'd never see in my lifetime. When you break it down it really is just a game, but it was one of the few things not in my control I wanted to witness before I'm gone and I'm really thankful."

White has also spoken about hearing loss in performing musicians, saying initially he did not use ear protection but added "it's something to think about more as I older and want to protect my senses.  After shows, I'll have this ringing in my ear where it sounds like there's a television on." White claims to have developed a form of obsessive-compulsive disorder over the years, noting his tendency "to perform certain actions in sequences of even numbers" and says he is "obsessed with the number 4" and also has a fear of flying on airplanes, and reportedly has never flown. White graduated Nazareth Area High School and currently lives in the suburbs of Philadelphia.

Discography
Four Songs EP (2012)
Track listing:

 "Maybe, Amy" (3:45)
 "Bloodshot" (5:25)
 "Before I Go Out" (3:28)
 "No Promises" (4:20)

Crazy Girl single (2015) 
"Crazy Girl" (3:54)

''High Road'' EP (2016) 
 "High Road" (3:02)
 "Like The Rain" (3:50)
 "12/26" (2:25)
 "September" (3:52)
 "Comin' Round Again" (3:04)
 "Random Hearts" (3:44)

References

External links
 Official website

1982 births
Living people
American male singer-songwriters
American rock musicians
American rock songwriters
American rock singers
East Stroudsburg University of Pennsylvania alumni
Nazareth Area High School alumni
People from Nazareth, Pennsylvania
People from Cranford, New Jersey
Shippensburg University of Pennsylvania alumni
Singer-songwriters from New Jersey
21st-century American singers
21st-century American male singers